Neculai Alexandru Ursu (August 3, 1926 – May 14, 2016) was a Romanian linguist, philologist, and literary historian. He graduated from Alexandru Ioan Cuza University and earned his doctorate in philology in 1967 for his work  (Formation of the Romanian scientific terminology). In 2013, Ursu became a corresponding member of the Romanian Academy.

References 

1926 births
2016 deaths
Alexandru Ioan Cuza University alumni
Romanian philologists
Linguists from Romania
Corresponding members of the Romanian Academy
People from Iași County